John Sides may refer to:
John H. Sides (1904–1978), American admiral
John M. Sides, American political scientist
John Sides, member of the 1967 Alabama Crimson Tide football team